Harley Smith-Shields (born 13 January 2000) is a professional rugby league footballer who plays as a er or  for the Canberra Raiders in the NRL.

Early career

2020
Smith-Shields made his first grade debut in round 11 of the 2020 NRL season for the Raiders against the South Sydney Rabbitohs.

In round 20, he scored his first try in the top grade in a 38-28 victory over Cronulla-Sutherland at Kogarah Oval.

2021
Smith-Shields played seven games for Canberra in the 2021 NRL season which saw the club finish a disappointing 10th on the table.

2022
In February, Smith-Shields was ruled out for the entire 2022 NRL season after rupturing his ACL.

References

External links
Canberra Raiders profile

2000 births
Living people
Australian rugby league players
Canberra Raiders players
Rugby league centres
Rugby league players from Canberra